Gorana (Serbian Cyrillic: Горана) is a Slavic female given name, meaning "mountain woman" or "woman from the highlands" (see male form Goran). The nickname is Goca (Serbian Cyrillic: Гоца).

People
Gorana Matić (born 1973), a Croatian tennis player that played for Yugoslavia and Croatia.
Gorana Marković, Swiss model

See also
Gordanka

Serbian feminine given names
Croatian feminine given names
Slovene feminine given names
Macedonian feminine given names
Bulgarian feminine given names
Ukrainian feminine given names
Czech feminine given names
Slovak feminine given names